Sunday Showcase is a Canadian radio show, which airs Sunday nights on CBC Radio One. The program, hosted by Damiano Pietropaolo, is an anthology of radio drama.

External links
 Sunday Showcase

CBC Radio One programs
Canadian radio dramas